Levi Stewart (April 28, 1812 – June 14, 1878) was a Mormon pioneer and a founder of Kanab, Utah.

Early years
Bishop Levi Stewart was born April 28, 1812 in West Edwardsville, Madison, IL to William Stewart (1784-1837) and Elizabeth Van Hooser (1788-1843).   Levi has two older brothers and two younger brothers.  Squire (1808-1809), Riley (1810-1866), William Jackson (1814-1884) and Urban Van (1817-1898).  He died at Johnson Canyon, Kane, Utah Territory on 14 June 1878 at the age of 66. 

He married his (1st) cousin Melinda Howard on 7 February 1833, and moved to Vandalia, Illinois.

Conversion. Missions, Latter-Day Saint Migration
In 1837 they were visited by Latter-Day Saint missionaries.  1st wife (1st cousin) Melinda Howard Stewart was quickly converted to the faith.  Levi traveled to Far West, Missouri to learn more.  There he was baptized by Jefferson Hunt.

Stewart and his family moved to Ambrosia, Missouri in 1838.  Later that year Governor Boggs of Missouri issued an Extermination Order for Mormons in that state.  The Stewarts returned to Illinois in early 1839.

From April to October 1839 Stewart served a mission with John D. Lee as his companion.  Together they preached in Illinois, Ohio, Kentucky, and Tennessee, and they baptized a number of people into The Church of Jesus Christ of Latter-Day Saints faith. 
      
Stewart moved his family to Nauvoo, Illinois in early 1840.  There he was a member of the Nauvoo Legion, and he helped to construct the Nauvoo Temple.  He took part in the School of the Prophets and developed a friendship with Joseph Smith.
      
Stewart was called to serve a mission to Gallatin County, Illinois, together with James Pace in 1843.  Again in 1844, he was called to be a missionary in Illinois and also to secure electors to vote for Joseph Smith for President of the United States.  Smith was murdered that June.

Stewart entered into the practice of polygamy, when he took a second wife, Charity Holdaway, in January 1846.  The marriage quickly dissolved when Charity decided that she could not support that lifestyle.

A few months later the Stewarts were forced from their home by a mob, and they relocated to Winter Quarters, Nebraska.  They remained encamped in that general vicinity for two years.  During that time Levi served as a courier, delivering mail  between the Mormon encampments and Nauvoo.  

The following spring, the Stewart family traveled to Salt Lake City, Utah as members of the Brigham Young Company, arriving in September 1848.

Years in Salt Lake Area
Stewart was granted a prime lot in central Salt Lake where he set up a home and a successful mercantile business.

Levi's first wife, Melinda, died in 1853 due to complications of child birth after delivering twins. He married another wife, Margery Wilkerson, in 1852. In 1854 he also married Margery’s sister, Artemacy Wilkerson.

At Brigham Young's request, Levi moved to Mills Creek in the Big Cottonwood Canyon to set up a paper mill in 1865.

He took a contract for grading a section of the Union Pacific Railroad in 1868, which became part of the First transcontinental railroad the following year. He employed 100 men for this task.

Kanab Years
In the winter of 1869, he accompanied Brigham Young to southern Utah to seek out locations for new Mormon settlement. In 1870, Young directed him to form a settlement at the abandoned outpost of Kanab. Stewart arrived in June. He led a number of families to the area. Levi Stewart became the first Mormon Bishop of Kanab, Utah in September 1870.  Over the next several years he directed the construction of dams and roads in the area, and he helped build a good relationship with the local Indians.

On December 14, 1870, his wife Margery, and 5 of his children, were killed in a fire. Stewart’s good friend Brigham Young traveled to Kanab to offer his condolences.
      
John Wesley Powell and fellow explorers passed through Kanab in 1872, and Stewart furnished them with food and supplies. His daughter, Eliza, telegraphed news of the expedition to Washington, DC.

Bishop Stewart took a final wife, Susan Eager, in 1874, but the marriage was short-lived.

The last of Stewart's 29 children was born in April 1878. A few months later, Stewart died of a stroke at Johnson Canyon while traveling to Salt Lake City to buy supplies for his mercantile business. His death was mourned by Mormons and Indians alike.

Legacy
A statue of Stewart now stands in central Kanab on the site of the fort fire that killed his wife and children.

His noteworthy descendants include:
William Thomas Stewart, his son; mayor of Kanab; Utah Territorial Legislature
Eliza Luella Stewart, his daughter; 1st telegraph operator in Arizona 
Levi Stewart Udall, his grandson; Chief Justice Arizona Supreme Court
Ivy Stewart (Houtz) Woolley, his great-granddaughter; Delegate to 1932 Republican National Convention
Stewart Udall, his great-grandson; U.S. Secretary of the Interior; U.S. Congress from Arizona
Mo Udall, his great-grandson; Pro basketball player; U.S. Presidential candidate; U.S. Congress from Arizona.
Mark Udall, his 2nd great-grandson; U.S. Congress from Colorado
Thomas Stewart Udall, his 2nd great-grandson; U.S. Congress from New Mexico

References

External links
Tribute and further info at stewartkin.com

Mormon pioneers
1812 births
1878 deaths
19th-century Mormon missionaries
Converts to Mormonism
History of the Latter Day Saint movement
Nauvoo Legion
American leaders of the Church of Jesus Christ of Latter-day Saints
People from Kanab, Utah
American city founders
People from Edwardsville, Illinois
People from Vandalia, Illinois
Latter Day Saints from Illinois
Latter Day Saints from Utah